Kigali Independent University (ULK) is a Rwandan institution of higher learning founded on 15 March 1996. A private university, ULK is located in Kigali. The university was founded by Rwigamba Balinda, who remains its presidet as of 2022.

Historical background
Kigali Independent University (ULK) was created in 1996, after the genocide in Rwanda which took place in 1994. Prof. Dr Rwigamba Balinda is the founder and owner of the University. ULK started its activities from the St Paul buildings.

After the St. Paul buildings, ULK built its first campus at Kacyiru currently these buildings holds the secondary school "Glory Secondary School". In 2007, All Administrative and teaching activities of ULK Kigali campus moved to the new headquarters at Gisozi sector.

In 2009, the university adopted the English language as its sole language of instruction.

Legal basis 
ULK is governed by the Law No. 27/2013 of 24/5/2013 governing the organization and functioning of Higher Education in Rwanda, the Law No. 13/2009 regulating Labor in Rwanda, the Presidential Order No. 51/01 of 13/7/2010 establishing quality standards in higher learning institutions.

Infrastructure 
From January 2007 all the ULK Kigali campus faculties and administration operate in the new Campus premises at Gisozi.

A large stadium with almost 14,000 places holding capacity. For the academic year 2012-2013, ULK acquired 3,520 new books. Total books in the physical library counts 66,200 titles and a digital library with 500 new computers which has access to different publishers of e-books and e-journals, with a total of 1,170 computers for all the ULK computer laboratories, as well as six generators, including four of 200 KVA; 22 vehicles; etc.

Academic life

School of Economics and Business Studies 
Departments:
Accounting
Finance
Economics
Rural Development (Gisenyi campus only)

School of Social Sciences 
Departments:
Development Studies
International Relations
Population Studies

School of Computer Sciences 
Department of Computer Science

School of Law 
Department of Law

Currently ULK Kigali campus has 4 buildings:
  The School of Science and Technology.
  The School of Economics and Business Studies, The faculty of Law, and The Faculty of Social Sciences
  The Masters building

Although ULK has only these four buildings in the Kigali Campus, it has a Master plan which will include many buildings, a hospital and a big stadium.

Notable alumni 

 Eugene Mussolini, member of the Chamber of Deputies

References

External links 
 Official site

Universities in Rwanda
Buildings and structures in Kigali
Universities and colleges in Rwanda
Education in Kigali
Educational institutions established in 1996
1996 establishments in Rwanda